WSGO (1440 AM) is a commercial radio station, licensed to Oswego, New York, and serving the northern suburbs of the Syracuse metropolitan area.  The station is owned by Galaxy Communications and airs a sports radio format.

The station, like most of Galaxy Communications' Oswego cluster, is a direct repeater of a Syracuse sister station, in WSGO's case, AM 1200 WTLA.  Like WTLA, it simulcasts its programming full-time on a 220 watt FM translator, W261AC, at 100.1 MHz).

WSGO operates at 1,000 watts by day.  But at night, when radio waves travel farther, it reduces power to only 45 watts to avoid interfering with other stations on AM 1440.  It uses a non-directional antenna at all times, located on Dutch Ridge Road in Oswego, adjacent to Route 481.

Programming
WSGO and WTLA have two local weekday sports shows, in middays and afternoon drive time.  The rest of the schedule features programming from ESPN Radio, the Syracuse ISP Sports Network (carrying Syracuse University sports), the New York Giants Radio Network and the NFL on Westwood One.  They had previously carried New York Mets baseball games until the New York Mets Radio Network was discontinued in 2019 due to the high cost of satellite time.

History
WSGO signed on the air on March 6, 1961.  It was owned by Clifford C. Harris and the studios were in the Pontiac Hotel.  Originally WSGO was a daytimer, required to go off the air at sunset to avoid interfering with other radio stations on AM 1440 at night when radio waves travel farther.  In the 1990s, it got permission from the Federal Communications Commission to stay on the air at night, but at only 45 watts.

In 2000, it was acquired by Galaxy Communications.  The studios and offices were relocated to Syracuse and WSGO became a full time simulcast station to 1200 WTLA.  For a time, it aired an adult standards format, from the "Music of Your Life" network.  It switched to sports radio in 2010, affiliating with the ESPN Radio Network.

References

External links

SGO
Sports in Syracuse, New York